Rage Against the Machine is the debut studio album by American rock band Rage Against the Machine. It was released on November 3, 1992, by Epic Records. The band released their first commercial demo tape of the same name 11 months prior to the album's release. The tape contained earlier recordings of 7 of the 10 songs found on this album.

With politically themed, revolutionary lyrical content, the album artwork was notable for featuring a graphic photograph of Thích Quảng Đức performing self-immolation. Coincidentally, the release date for Rage Against the Machine was on November 3, 1992, the same day as the 1992 United States presidential election.

Rage Against the Machine was a critical success upon release with several critics noting the album's politically motivated agenda and praising Zack de la Rocha's strong vocal delivery. Rated number 24 on Rolling Stones list of "100 Greatest Metal Albums of All Time", the album peaked at number 1 on the US Billboard Heatseekers chart and number 45 on the US Billboard 200 and has gone on to achieve triple platinum sales certification in the US. Multiple publications consider it one of the best albums of the 1990s.

Artwork and sleeve notes

The cover features a crop of Malcolm Browne's famous photograph of the self-immolation of Thích Quảng Đức, a Vietnamese Buddhist monk, in Saigon in 1963. The monk was protesting President Ngô Đình Diệm's administration for oppressing the Buddhist religion. The photograph drew international attention and persuaded U.S. President John F. Kennedy to withdraw support for Diệm's government. In 1963, Associated Press correspondent Browne's coverage of the event earned the World Press Photo of the Year award.

The songs on Rage Against the Machine all feature political messages. Activists such as Provisional IRA hunger striker Bobby Sands and Black Panther Party founder Huey P. Newton are listed in the "Thanks For Inspiration" section. Also thanked were Ian and Alec MacKaye.

The lyrics for each song were printed in the album booklet with the exception of those for "Killing in the Name", which were omitted; the booklet reads "2. KILLING IN THE NAME", skips the lyrics and continues with the next song.

The statement "no samples, keyboards or synthesizers used in the making of this record" can be found at the end of the sleeve notes. Similar statements were made in the band's subsequent albums. The band also refer to themselves as "Guilty Parties" for each album.

Tour
The album was supported by the Rage Against the Machine Tour, which commenced on January 15, 1993, in Chicago and concluded on December 31, 1993, in Detroit. Rage Against The Machine was accompanied by opening acts in certain concerts, such as hip hop groups House of Pain and Cypress Hill.

Critical reception

Rage Against the Machine received critical acclaim. In a contemporary review, NME wrote that "what makes RATM more than just another bunch of prodigiously capable genre-benders is their total lack of pretension or contrivance ... the results burn with an undeniable conviction." Q magazine deemed it "a record of real attitude and energy", while Los Angeles Times critic Robert Hilburn hailed it as "a striking, politically conscious debut" and de la Rocha "a bona fide star who combines on stage a Bob Marley-like charisma and a Chuck D.-style rap command -- and the music itself is as tough and relentless as his raps."

Robert Christgau was somewhat less impressed in The Village Voice, summing it up as "metal for rap-lovers—and opera-haters" while naming "Know Your Enemy" and "Wake Up" as highlights. AllMusic reviewer Eduardo Rivadavia wrote in a retrospective review, "it was the first album to successfully merge the seemingly disparate sounds of rap and heavy metal", he also praised the album's "meaningful rhymes and emotionally charged conviction" calling it "essential".

In 2001, Q named Rage Against the Machine as one of the 50 Heaviest Albums of All Time. The album is included in the book 1001 Albums You Must Hear Before You Die. In 2003, the album was ranked number 368 on Rolling Stone magazine's list of The 500 Greatest Albums of All Time, climbing to number 365 in the 2012 revision and shooting up to number 221 in the 2020 reboot of the list. It was ranked number 24 on the magazine's list of "100 Greatest Metal Albums of All Time".

In December 2008, BBC Radio 1 DJ Zane Lowe included Rage Against the Machine as one of 28 albums in his 'Masterpieces' series. In October 2011, Rage Against the Machine was ranked number five on Guitar World magazine's top ten list of guitar albums of 1992.

XX 20th anniversary special edition 
The band announced on October 9, 2012, via their Facebook page that they would be releasing a special 20th anniversary box set to commemorate the group's debut album. The box set contains never-before-released concert material, including the band's 2010 Live at Finsbury Park show and footage from early in their career, as well as a digitally remastered version of the album, B-sides and the original demo tape (on disc for the first time). The collection was released on November 27, 2012.

The release features three distinct versions:

Deluxe box set featuring two CDs, two DVDs, one 12-inch 180gm vinyl LP, one 40 page booklet and two-sided poster
Special edition featuring two CDs and a bonus DVD featuring six tracks
Single compact disc (with three bonus tracks)

Track listing

''Anger Is a Gift bonus disc – released with the 1995 Australian CD re-release
"Darkness" – 3:40
"Year of tha Boomerang" – 4:02
"Freedom" (Remix) – 6:14
"Take the Power Back" (Live) – 6:12Bonus Maxi 12-inch from the "Limited Tour Edition" red vinyl 1993 European re-release included this second LP labeled sides C and D

C1 "Freedom" (Live) – 6:13
C2 "Bombtrack" (From Mark Goodier's "Evening Session") – 4:08
C3 "Bullet in the Head" (Remix) – 5:40
D1 "Darkness of Greed" – 3:40
D2 "Bullet in the Head" (Live) – 5:44
D3 "Bombtrack" (Live) – 5:33

All songs from both bonuses are the versions from previously released singles and promos, except C1 which is from a different performance. No information is given on the 12-inch about the date nor venue.

Personnel
Rage Against the Machine
 Zack de la Rocha – vocals, production, art direction
 Tom Morello – guitar, production, art direction
 Tim Commerford (credited as "Timmy C.") – bass, backing vocals, production, art direction
 Brad Wilk – drums, percussion, production, art direction

Additional musicians
 Maynard James Keenan – additional vocals on "Know Your Enemy"
 Stephen Perkins – additional percussion on "Know Your Enemy"

Technical
 Craig Doubet – assistant engineer
 Stan Katayama – engineer
 Nicky Lindeman – art direction
 Garth Richardson – production, engineering
 Jeff Sheehan – assistant engineer
 Steve Sisco – mixing assistant
 Andy Wallace – mixing
 Bob Ludwig – mastering (1992 CD and vinyl)
 Steve Hoffman – mastering (2016 Hybrid SACD)

Charts

Weekly charts

Year-end charts

Certifications

References 

1992 debut albums
Rage Against the Machine albums
Epic Records albums
Albums produced by Garth Richardson
Albums recorded at Sound City Studios